Carrbridge is a village in Badenoch and Strathspey in the Scottish Highlands. It lies off the A9 on the A938, west of Skye of Curr and southeast of Tomatin, near Bogroy. It has the oldest stone bridge in the Highlands and the nearby ancient pine forest contains the Landmark Forest Adventure Park.

Geography
It was an early centre for skiing in Scotland. In the 2001 census the village had a population of 708 people, with the majority employed in tourism.

Until the construction of a bypass in the 1980s, the A9 ran straight through the village. Carrbridge is served by Carrbridge railway station on the Highland Main Line.

Local debate still rages regarding the name Carrbridge itself, with some preferring to see it hyphenated to Carr-bridge. The word "Carr" has nothing to do with motorised transport but is derived from the Old Norse word for boggy area.

Attractions

Carrbridge's most famous landmark is the old Carrbridge Packhorse Bridge, from which the village is named. The bridge, built in 1717, is the oldest stone bridge in the Highlands. It was severely damaged in the "muckle spate" of 1829 which left it in the condition seen today. In 1847 someone wrote to the Inverness Courier giving it as an example of one of the "all but deserted [bridges of which] the most useful and picturesque ought to be preserved". It is now unstable and is recommended only to be viewed from afar. Jumping off the bridge into the River Dulnain below had long been a popular pastime for younger locals and the more adventurous tourists.

Landmark Forest Adventure Park is set in an ancient pine forest at the south end of the village. It has a variety of attractions, including a wild water coaster, steam powered saw mill and the UK's first nature trail, Treetop Trail.

There has been a Boys' Brigade campsite in the village for many years.

Duthil Old Parish Church and Churchyard, located nearby, includes many graves and memorials of Clan Grant.

Events
The village plays host to two popular annual competitions: The Golden Spurtle World Porridge Making Championship and the "Carve Carrbridge" Scottish Open Chainsaw Carving Competition.  Both contests offer keen but friendly competition, drawing entrants and spectators from all over the world.

Throughout the year, many events are held by Carrbridge Community Arts, a dynamic and innovative local community group, which include Music, Art, Theatre, Celebrations and Festivals.

In the news
In 2009 the village took on the BBC claiming that the Corporation constantly got the weather wrong which was putting off tourists. Local businesses claimed that BBC weather reports on television and on their website constantly reported rain despite there being no rain whatsoever. Locals stated that the BBC generalised the weather to "rain in Scotland". Carrbridge became a minor celebrity with the story appearing on national news networks and the quiz show Have I Got News for You.

Notable people
 Blackmill, a Dubstep musician

Sport
The village has its own association football team, Carrbridge FC which plays in the Strathspey & Badenoch Welfare FA League and in local cup competitions. They won the League in 1986 and 2008, but were unable to field a team in 2009 & 2010. Their home ground is in the centre of the village (next to the main car park) and their home colours are black & white vertical stripes.

Golfers are catered for with a challenging 9-hole golf course. The village also has a pony trekking centre and a bowling green.

Wildlife
The local pine forests are home to crossbills, crested tits, red squirrels and deer. Nearby areas provide summer habitats for common snipe, greenshanks, Eurasian oystercatchers, northern lapwings and others. On the nature trail in Landmark Forest Adventure Park, there is a special feeding area that attracts pine wood birds and the red squirrel - endangered in most of the country due to competition from the introduced grey squirrel. Around the area, there are rarely seen golden eagles on the mountains and peregrine falcons are more common. Ospreys fly to their summer home in Loch Garten and red deer are commonly seen.

References

 
Populated places in Badenoch and Strathspey